Egyek is a large village in Hajdú-Bihar county, in the Northern Great Plain region of eastern Hungary. Olympian László Mucza was born here.

Before World War II, there was a Jewish community. At its height, there were 123 Jews in the community most of them were murdered by the Nazis in the Holocaust.

Geography

International relations

Twin towns — Sister cities
Egyek is twinned with:

  Radzyń Podlaski, Poland

References

External links

 Official site in Hungarian

Populated places in Hajdú-Bihar County
Jewish communities destroyed in the Holocaust